Villa Fiorito is a city in the Lomas de Zamora Partido  of Buenos Aires Province, to the south of central Buenos Aires, Argentina. It forms part of the Greater Buenos Aires urban conurbation. Many Italian and Spanish descendants live there. In recent decades people from other provinces have come to live near central Buenos Aires, creating new slums in the city. Diego Maradona, considered one of the best footballers of all time, was raised in Villa Fiorito.

Notable residents
Claudio García, footballer
Diego Maradona, footballer
Facundo Medina, footballer
Héctor Yazalde, footballer
Natalia Zaracho, cartonera and politician

References

External links

Populated places in Buenos Aires Province
Lomas de Zamora Partido
Cities in Argentina
Argentina